Colorado River Numic (also called Ute , Southern Paiute , Ute–Southern Paiute, or Ute-Chemehuevi ), of the Numic branch of the Uto-Aztecan language family, is a dialect chain that stretches from southeastern California to Colorado. Individual dialects are Chemehuevi, which is in danger of extinction, Southern Paiute (Moapa, Cedar City, Kaibab, and San Juan subdialects), and Ute (Central Utah, Northern, White Mesa, Southern subdialects). According to the Ethnologue, there were a little less than two thousand speakers of Colorado River Numic Language in 1990, or around 40% out of an ethnic population of 5,000.

The Southern Paiute dialect has played a significant role in linguistics, as the background for a famous article by linguist Edward Sapir and his collaborator Tony Tillohash on the nature of the phoneme.

Dialects
The three major dialect groups of Colorado River are Chemehuevi, Southern Paiute, and Ute, although there are no strong isoglosses. The threefold division is primarily one of culture rather than strictly linguistic. There are, however, three major phonological distinctions among the dialects:

In Southern Paiute and Ute, initial  has been lost: Chemehuevi  'drink', other dialects  'drink'.
In Ute, nasal-stop clusters have become voiceless geminate stops: Ute  'horse, pet', other dialects .
In Ute, the mid back round vowel  has been fronted to : Ute  'lungs', other dialects .

There are no strong isoglosses between Southern Paiute and Ute for the changes but an increasing level of change, as one moves from Kaibab Southern Paiute (0% of nasal-stop clusters have changed) to Southern Ute (100% of nasal-stop clusters have changed).

Phonology
Consonant and vowel charts for the westernmost and easternmost dialects are given.

Consonants

Vowels 

Vowels can be long or short.  Short unstressed vowels can be devoiced.

Morphology
The Colorado River Numic language is an agglutinative language, in which words use suffix complexes for a variety of purposes with several morphemes strung together.

References

Bibliography
 Bunte, Pamela A. (1979). "Problems in Southern Paiute Syntax and Semantics," Indiana University Ph.D. dissertation.
 Charney, Jean O. (1996). A Dictionary of the Southern Ute Language. Ignacio, Colorado: Ute Press.
 Givón, Talmy (2011). Ute Reference Grammar. Culture and Language Use Volume 3. Amsterdam: John Benjamins Publishing Company.
 Laird, Carobeth (1976). The Chemehuevis. Banning, CA: Malki Museum Press.
 Mithun, Marianne (1999). Languages of Native North America. Cambridge: Cambridge University Press.
 Press, Margaret L. (1979). Chemehuevi, A Grammar and Lexicon. University of California Publications in Linguistics Volume 92. Berkeley, CA. University of California Press.
 Sapir, Edward (1930). Southern Paiute, a Shoshonean Language. Reprinted in 1992 in: The Collected Works of Edward Sapir, X, Southern Paiute and Ute Linguistics and Ethnography. Ed. William Bright. Berlin: Mouton deGruyter.
 Sapir, Edward (1931). Southern Paiute Dictionary. Reprinted in 1992 in: The Collected Works of Edward Sapir, X, Southern Paiute and Ute Linguistics and Ethnography. Ed. William Bright. Berlin: Mouton deGruyter.

External links
 A Preliminary Analysis of Southern Ute with a Special Focus on Noun Phrases - also contains phonology information
 Chemehuevi language overview at the Survey of California and Other Indian Languages
 A Chemehuevi Language Archive - 1970s Fieldwork and Analysis by Margaret L. Press
 OLAC resources in and about the Ute-Southern Paiute language
 Collected Works of Edward Sapir, Vol. X: Southern Paiute and Ute Linguistics and Ethnography
 Ute Dictionary

Numic languages
Agglutinative languages
Indigenous languages of Nevada
Indigenous languages of Arizona
Indigenous languages of California
Indigenous languages of the Southwestern United States
Paiute
Ute tribe
Chemehuevi
Endangered indigenous languages of the Americas